The Nobel Women's Initiative is an international advocacy organisation based in Ottawa, Canada. It was created in 2006 by six female winners of the Nobel Peace Prize to support women's groups around the world in campaigning for justice, peace and equality. The six founders are Shirin Ebadi, Wangari Maathai, Rigoberta Menchú, Jody Williams, Mairead Maguire, and Betty Williams. The only other living female Nobel Peace Prize winner, Aung San Suu Kyi, was under house arrest at the time of the initiative's formation. She became an honorary member on her release in 2010. The initiative's first conference, in 2007, focused on women, conflict and security in the Middle East.

The initiative defines "peace" as "the commitment to quality and justice; a democratic world free of physical, economic, cultural, political, religious, sexual and environmental violence and the constant threat of these forms of violence against women—indeed against all of humanity."

See also
List of anti-war organizations
List of peace activists
List of women pacifists and peace activists
List of women's rights organizations

References

Further reading

External links
 Official web site

Nobel Prize
International political organizations
International women's organizations
International organizations based in Canada
International Campaign to Abolish Nuclear Weapons